Eceler is a village in the Kâhta District, Adıyaman Province, Turkey. The village is populated by Kurds of the Canbegan tribe and had a population of 169 in 2021.

The hamlets of Küçük Eceler, Öcek and Samanlı are attached to the village.

References

Villages in Kâhta District
Kurdish settlements in Adıyaman Province